Aleksei Kravchenko (Russian: Алексе́й Кра́вченко) may refer to:
* Aleksei Ilyich Kravchenko (1889–1940), Russian painter, illustrator, draughtsman and printmaker
 Aleksei Yevgenyevich Kravchenko (born 1969), Soviet and Russian actor
 Aleksei Igorevich Kravchenko (* 1986), Russian diver, took part in Diving at the 2009 World Aquatics Championships – Men's 10 metre platform